Sol D'Menta is the eponymous debut album of the band of the same name. The album was released by Polygram on June 18, 1996.

The album produced two singles: "Cachetera" and "Inconformes" that received heavy airplay on local radio stations. It also includes a cover of the famous song "Oubao Moin" originally sung by Roy Brown.

Track listing 
All songs written by Sol D'Menta except where noted.
 "Cachetera" - 5:18
 "La Prieta" - 3:17
 "Skalamientos" - 5:50
 "Rosa" - 4:08
 "Vagabundo" - 4:01
 "Pepo Kaneka" - 2:43
 "No Te Me Sulfures" - 3:51
 "Inconforme" - 3:18
 "Falsos Profetas" - 3:19
 "Boquisucio" - 4:49
 "Oubao Moin" (Roy Brown, Juan Antonio Corretjer) - 8:51

Musicians

Band members
 Ricky Díaz - vocals
 Erick "Jey" Seda - bass
 Miguel "Tito" Rodríguez - guitar
 Ernesto "Che" Rodríguez - drums

Guest musicians
 Johanka Evertz - Guest vocals on "Cachetera"
 Silvia Sallaberry - Guest vocals on "No te me sulfures" and "Oubao Moin"
 Tony "Dr. Feelgood" - Guest vocals on "Incomformes", "Falsos Profetas"

Personnel
 Produced by Sol d' Menta and Carlos Sallaberry
 Recorded at Ochoa Recording, Puerto Rico
 Kiko Hurtado - Recording Engineer
 Mixed at Critteria Studios, Miami, Florida
 Jorge Alvarez - Mix Director
 Ron Taylor y Alex Soler - Mix Engineers
 Mastered at Fuller Sound Inc.
 Rod Fuller - Master Engineer
 José Barceló - Executive producer

1996 albums
Sol D'Menta albums